The Rural Municipality of Nipawin No. 487 is a rural municipality (RM) in the Canadian province of Saskatchewan within Census Division No. 14 and  Division No. 4.

History 
The RM of Nipawin No. 487 incorporated as a rural municipality on December 9, 1912.

Geography

Communities and localities 
The following urban municipalities are surrounded by the RM.

Towns
 Nipawin

Villages
 Aylsham
 Codette

The following unincorporated communities are within the RM.

Localities
 Carlea
 Elk Hill
 Inkster
 Klemmer
 Lost River
 Pontrilas

Demographics 

Attractions 
 Nipawin & District Living Forestry Museum
 Nipawin Regional Park
 Wapiti Valley Regional Park
 Wapiti Valley
 Maurice Street Provincial Protected Area

Government 
The RM of Nipawin No. 487 is governed by an elected municipal council and an appointed administrator that meets on the second Tuesday of every month. The reeve of the RM is Dona Hoppe while its administrator is Nathalie Hipkins. The RM's office is located in Codette.

Infrastructure 
The RM is home to the Nipawin Hydroelectric Station.

Transportation 
 Saskatchewan Highway 6
 Saskatchewan Highway 35
 Saskatchewan Highway 55
 Saskatchewan Highway 255
 Saskatchewan Highway 691
 Saskatchewan Highway 789
 Crooked Bridge
 Canadian National Railway
 Nipawin Airport

See also 
List of rural municipalities in Saskatchewan

References

External links 

N